Sir Norton Knatchbull, 1st Baronet (26 December 1602 – 3 February 1685) was an English politician who sat in the House of Commons at various times between 1640 and 1679.

Life
Knatchbull was born at Mersham Hatch in Kent, the second son of Thomas Knatchbull and his wife Eleanor Astley, daughter of John Astley. In April 1640, Knatchbull was elected Member of Parliament for Kent in the Short Parliament. He was elected MP for New Romney for the Long Parliament in November 1640. He sat until 1648 when he was excluded under Pride's Purge.

In April 1660, Knatchbull was re-elected MP for New Romney in the Convention Parliament. He was re-elected MP for New Romney again in 1661 for the Cavalier Parliament and sat until 1679. Knatchbull was knighted, and on 4 August 1641, he was created a Baronet, of Mersham Hatch, in the County of Kent.

Works
In 1659 Knatchbull published Animadversiones in Libros Novi Testamenti. Paradoxæ Orthodoxæ, London. Guil. Godbid. in vico vulgo vocato Little-Brittain, 1659. The work consists of a large number of critical emendations, based on a knowledge of Hebrew. A second edition with appendix was published in 1672, a third, Oxford, 1677; a fourth edition, in English, appeared in 1692, entitled Annotations upon some difficult Texts in all the Books of the New Testament, Cambridge, 1693; it is preceded by an Encomiastick upon the most Learned and Judicious Author, by Thomas Walker of Sidney Sussex College. The original was reprinted at Amsterdam, and also at Frankfort, where it formed part of the supplement to Nikolaus Gürtler's edition of Brian Walton's Polyglot Bible. 1695–1701. The work had a reputation for a century after its publication, and figures in a list of books annotated by Ambrose Bonwicke. John Kitto, however, found Knatchbull's remarks superficial.

In 1680, Peter du Moulin the younger dedicated to Knatchbull his Short View of the Chief Points in Controversy between the Reformed Churches and the Church of Rome, a translation from an unprinted manuscript by his father, Peter du Moulin the elder, which had been made over to him for purposes of publication by the baronet. James Duport, the tutor of his son John, addressed three Latin odes in his Musæ Subsecivæ to Knatchbull, who according to Ballard, himself acted as tutor to Dorothy, Lady Pakington.

Family
Knatchbull married firstly Dorothy Westtrow, daughter of Thomas Westtrow on 22 October 1630, and had by her three sons.  He married secondly Dorothy Steward, widow of Sir Edward Steward and daughter of Sir Robert Honyewood at St Martin-in-the-Fields outside London on 27 November 1662. He was succeeded in the baronetcy successiveley by his sons John and Thomas.

Legacy
The Norton Knatchbull School, situated in Ashford, was founded by his uncle and namesake, Sir Norton Knatchbull (d.1636)

References

Attribution

 

1602 births
1685 deaths
Norton
Baronets in the Baronetage of England
People from Mersham
English MPs 1640 (April)
English MPs 1640–1648
English MPs 1660
English MPs 1661–1679